Eka Ramdani (born 18 June 1984), also known as Ebol, is an former Indonesian professional footballer who lastly played for Persib Bandung.

International career
His unofficial international debut in Golkar birthday when Indonesia national football team drew 2-2 with South Africa at Gelora Bung Karno Stadium, and First official international debut in the Indonesia national football team for 2006 Merdeka Tournament by drawing 1-1 with Malaysia on 23 August 2006.

International Goals

|}

Honours

Country honors
Indonesia U-21
Hassanal Bolkiah Trophy: 2002

Indonesia
Indonesian Independence Cup: 2008

External links 

Indonesian footballers
1984 births
Living people
Persib Bandung players
Sundanese people
Indonesia international footballers
Persisam Putra Samarinda players
2007 AFC Asian Cup players
Association football midfielders
Pelita Bandung Raya players
Indonesia under-21 international footballers
People from Purwakarta Regency
Sportspeople from West Java
21st-century Indonesian people